The March Hare is a lost 1921 American silent comedy romance film produced and distributed by Adolph Zukor's Realart Pictures Corporation. It stars Bebe Daniels.

Cast
Bebe Daniels as Lizbeth Ann Palmer
Grace Morse as Clara Belle Palmer
Herbert Sherwood as Lucius Palmer
Helen Jerome Eddy as Susie
Sidney Bracey as Meadows
Frances Raymond as Mrs. Rollins
Melbourne MacDowell as Senator Rollins
Harry Myers as Tod Rollins

References

External links

1921 films
American silent feature films
Lost American films
1921 romantic comedy films
American romantic comedy films
American black-and-white films
Films directed by Maurice Campbell
1921 lost films
Lost romantic comedy films
1920s American films
Silent romantic comedy films
Silent American comedy films
1920s English-language films